The following television stations in the United States brand as channel 9 (though neither using virtual channel 9 nor broadcasting on physical RF channel 9):
 KBJR-DT3 in Superior, Wisconsin
 KEPR-DT2 in Pasco, Washington
 KIMA-DT2 in Yakima, Washington
 KRII-DT9 in Chisholm, Minnesota
 WCTX in New Haven, Connecticut

The following television stations in the United States formerly branded as channel 9: 
 KUSI-TV in San Diego, California
 WRDE-LD in Rehoboth Beach, Delaware

09 branded